Mohammad Sabir can refer to:

 Mohammad Sabir (cricketer, born 1943), Pakistani cricketer
 Mohammad Sabir (cricketer, born 2001), Afghan cricketer
 Mohammad Sabir (cricketer, born 2002), Afghan cricketer
 Mohammed Sabir (fl. 2006), British businessman